Liamani Segura (born October 24, 2008) is an American child singer from Racine, Wisconsin. Self-taught, she began performing in public at age six, singing the US national anthem before large crowds at high school and professional basketball and baseball games. She has sung the national anthem at many venues, including the Indy 500, Game 1 of Major League Baseball's 2018 National League Division Series between the Milwaukee Brewers and Colorado Rockies at Miller Park, and the 2019 NCAA Women's Final Four Championship Game. Her voice is described as powerful and loud in contrast to her petite frame. In 2018, she was cast in the lead role of Dorothy in The Wiz at the Lees–McRae College summer theatre in North Carolina.

Biography

Liamani Segura was born in Racine, Wisconsin, on October 24, 2008. Her father, Anthony Segura, is a disabled veteran of the United States Army Reserve and her mother, Joanna, is a registered nurse. She has an older sister and a younger brother.

Segura began singing when she was two. Self-taught, she did not take voice lessons or participate in organized musical activities as a girl. She practiced her vocal inflections by watching music videos on YouTube.

She sang the national anthem in public for the first time at a school talent show when she was in kindergarten, and soon branched out to sporting venues. In her second live performance outside her home in February 2015, she sang "The Star-Spangled Banner" before 1,300 attendees at a St. Catherine's High School basketball game. Two months later, she performed the national anthem at a Milwaukee Brewers baseball game; she was invited back to sing at Miller Park in 2016 and again in 2017. In October 2018, she sang the national anthem before Game 1 of the 2018 National League Division Series between the Milwaukee Brewers and Colorado Rockies at Miller Park.

Segura has performed the national anthem before basketball games of St. Catherine's High School, Horlick High School, Park High School, Marquette Golden Eagles, and the Milwaukee Bucks; baseball games of the Milwaukee Brewers; the Indy 500; and the Miss Racine beauty contest. Her voice is described as powerful and loud in contrast to her petite frame.

Segura competed on America's Got Talent, but was eliminated before the televised round.

In 2018, the nine-year-old Segura was cast as Dorothy in the Lees–McRae College Summer Theatre production of The Wiz.

In 2019, Segura sang the national anthem at the NCAA Women's Final Four Championship game.

In 2020, Segura started her own YouTube channel on which she uploads videos from her live performances as well as sings covers of contemporary songs. She participated in the Deborah Cox Challenge, posting her cover of the ending to Cox's song "Nobody's Supposed to Be Here" on Instagram and earning high praise from Cox herself. During the COVID-19 pandemic, she videotaped the national anthem for a virtual Memorial Day livestream event and sang the national anthem in a fan-less stadium for the Milwaukee Brewers' home opener on July 31.

In 2022, Segura was cast in High School Musical: The Musical: The Series as Emmy.

Awards and honors
Segura has placed first in the Racine Journal Times reader poll for best musician in the county in 2018, 2019, and 2020.

She won second prize for her performance of "I'll Be There" at a 2019 talent show benefiting the HOPES Center of Racine sponsored by the Racine Dominican Sisters.

References

External links
Facebook page
8 Year Old Liamani Segura performs the national anthem via YouTube

2008 births
Living people
American child singers
America's Got Talent contestants
Singers from Wisconsin
Musicians from Racine, Wisconsin
21st-century American singers
2018 Major League Baseball season
21st-century American women singers